Masterworks Broadway is a record label created by the consolidation of Sony Music Entertainment's Broadway theatre music divisions, Columbia Broadway Masterworks and RCA Victor Records' Broadway series.

Masterworks Broadway's recent releases include the revival new cast recording of South Pacific (2008), Avenue Q (2003), Hairspray (2002) and Chicago (1997).

The record label's chief competitors are Angel Broadway, owned by UMG and Decca Broadway, which is also owned by Universal Music Group.

See also
 List of record labels

References

External links
 Sony Masterworks Official Site
 Masterworks Broadway Official Site
 Sony Masterworks Official Blog
 Masterworks Broadway Podcast Theatre

Record labels established in 2006
American record labels
Sony Music